Tailem Bend railway station is located on the Adelaide-Wolseley line in Tailem Bend, South Australia. It is also the junction point for the Loxton and Pinnaroo lines.

History
Tailem Bend station opened on 1 May 1886 as a station on the Nairne-Bordertown extension of what became the Adelaide-Wolseley line. It became a junction station with the Pinnaroo line constructed in 1906 and the Brown's Well line in 1913. The Brown's Well line was eventually extended to Barmera in 1928, and had several branches with trains that operated back to Tailem Bend. Trains on the Peebinga, Loxton, Moorook and Waikerie lines all passed through Tailem Bend. All were built as broad gauge lines. The current station was opened on 7 October 1913. On 27 June 1926, locomotive servicing facilities were opened including a roundhouse.

In 1995, as part of the One Nation program the Adelaide-Wolseley line was converted to standard gauge, and Tailem Bend became a break of gauge station until 1998, when the remaining broad gauge branch lines to Pinnaroo and Loxton were converted to standard gauge. In May 1999, the station closed when The Overland, then operated by Great Southern Rail began operating on a new timetable that skipped multiple stations including Tailem Bend. On 22 May 2005, it was restored and reopened as a museum. The two remaining branch lines out of Tailem Bend, the Loxton and Pinnaroo lines closed in 2015 after grain train operations on those lines ceased. The Viterra owned grain silos and bunkers in Tailem Bend are still served by rail.

References

External links
Johnny's Pages gallery

Disused railway stations in South Australia
Railway stations in Australia opened in 1913
Railway stations closed in 1996
South Australian Heritage Register